Harunur Rashid is a politician of Awami League and former Member of Parliament for Laxmipur-2 (Raipur-Lakshmipur Sadar) constituency.

Early life 
Rashid was born in Lakshmipur District.

Career 
Rashid is the Central Youth and Sports Secretary of Awami League.

Rashid is a former VP of Dhaka College.

Bangladesh Nationalist Party chairperson Khaleda Zia was elected Member of Parliament from Laxmipur-2 (Raipur-Lakshmipur Sadar) constituency in the 7th Parliamentary Election held on 12 June 1996. She later gave up the seat to represent another, Rashid was elected in the by-election by defeating Moudud Ahmed, the candidate of Bangladesh Nationalist Party. He lost the eighth parliamentary elections in 2001 and the ninth parliamentary elections in 2008.

References 

Dhaka College alumni
7th Jatiya Sangsad members
Awami League politicians
Living people
People from Lakshmipur District
Year of birth missing (living people)